Housni Thaoubani (born 15 June 1996) is a judoka from Comoros.

He was selected to compete in the Judo at the 2020 Summer Olympics – Men's 81 kg.

References

External links
 

Living people
1996 births
Comorian male judoka
Olympic judoka of the Comoros
Judoka at the 2020 Summer Olympics